The surname Bismarck is most often associated with Otto von Bismarck (1815–1898), a Prussian statesman and first Chancellor of Germany.

Others with the name include:

 Carl-Eduard von Bismarck (born 1961), German politician and great-great-grandson of Otto von Bismarck
 Debonnaire von Bismarck (born 1959), English businesswoman and socialite
 Ernst Ludwig Wilhelm von Bismarck (1772–1815), Prussian army officer during the Napoleonic Wars
 Gottfried Graf von Bismarck-Schönhausen (1901–1949), Nazi parliamentary representative, grandson of Otto von Bismarck
 Gottfried von Bismarck (1962–2007), son of Prince Ferdinand von Bismarck, great-great-grandson of Otto von Bismarck
 Herbert von Bismarck (1849–1904), Secretary of State, son of Otto von Bismarck
 Julius von Bismarck (born 1983), German artist
 Mona von Bismarck (1897–1983), American socialite and fashion icon
 Otto Christian Archibald von Bismarck (1897–1975),  grandson of Chancellor Otto von Bismarck, politician and diplomat, Prince of Bismarck

Surnames
Surnames of German origin
German-language surnames